The Portage-des-Roches dam (Portage-des-Roches being the translation of the Montagnais Ashini Kushnapagan) or  Taschereau Dam (in honor of Louis-Alexandre Taschereau) is a dam located in the Laterrière sector of borough Chicoutimi, at Saguenay, Quebec, Canada. The largest water retaining structure in Kenogami Lake, this dam constitutes the source of the Chicoutimi River, whose flow is totally dependent on it.

Geography 

Portage-des-Roches is located at confluence between Chicoutimi River and the eastern end of Kénogami Reservoir. This natural corridor carved out by glaciation is a depression located between the elevation of Lac Jean-Deschênes that of the southern valley of the Saguenay–Lac-Saint-Jean or Laurentides Wildlife Reserve.

History

Native American occupation

European exploration 
As part of the main portage suite which links the Saguenay to Lac Saint-Jean, by Kenogami Lake and Chicoutimi River, Portage-des-Roches was borrowed by Father Jean Dequen in 1652. In 1732, it was the surveyor Joseph-Laurent Normandin, who translated the Montagnais term Ashini Kushnapagan into Portage-des-Roches.

Colonization

Construction of the dam

Saguenay flood 

In 2010, the Government of Quebec issued a call for tenders to improve the evacuation capacity of the spillway, raise the crest of the dam and replace wooden valves with steel valves with an independent system that can be controlled remotely. The various works take account of the technical recommendations contained in the report of the Nicolet Commission.

The total cost of the rehabilitation project is estimated at $50 million. The work must be completed in 2013.

See also 

 Chicoutimi River

Notes and references

Bibliography

External links 
 Hydrological forecasts
 Le Portage-des-Roches; We go there, we stay there by François Lafortune

Dams in Quebec
Buildings and structures in Saguenay, Quebec